Nestlé Waters is a Swiss multinational bottled water division of Nestlé it was founded in 1992.

Key Facts and figures (2015) 

Sales: 7.625 billion CHF

Nestlé Waters has roughly 31,740 employees and includes several brands such as Acqua Panna, San Pellegrino, Perrier, Vittel, Al Manhal and Buxton.

History 

1843: Henri Nestlé establishes his first lemonade and water bottling factory.

1866: Foundation of the Nestlé Group

1969: Acquisition of a 30% stake in the Société Générale des Eaux Minérales de Vittel in France

1974: Acquisition of the German Blaue Quellen group.

1987: Nestlé S.A. takes a majority stake in Vittel and joins with Arrowhead. 

1992: Acquisition of the Source Perrier S.A. Source Perrier SA Group. Nestlé becomes the leading player on the world bottled water market, under the name of Nestlé 
Sources International (NSI)

1996: NSI changes its name to accelerate its international development and becomes: Perrier Vittel S.A.

1998: Take-over of Italy's leading bottled water producer, Sanpellegrino S.p.A. and launch of Nestlé Pure Life, the first multi-site bottled water under the Nestlé 
Brand

2000: Simultaneous launch of Nestlé Aquarel, pan-European, multi-site spring water on six markets.

2001: Acquisition by Perrier Vittel of Al Manhal, the leading bottled water company in Saudi Arabia which becomes the leading bottled water player in the Middle  
East region.

2002: Perrier Vittel becomes Nestlé Waters CEO Leader

2003: Nestlé Waters acquires the Powwow Group

2005: Nestlé Waters further develops its business on the African continent via the launch of Nestlé Pure Life in Nigeria and the creation of a partnership in 
Algeria

2006: Nestlé Waters acquires the majority shares in Erikli and becomes the Turkish market leader.

2007: Nestlé Waters acquires Sources Minérales Henniez S.A. and becomes the Swiss leader in the bottled water market. Joint venture agreements signed in Mexico and Chile.

2008: Nestlé Pure Life, has become in just a decade the world's leading bottled water brand, with 5 billion liters sold worldwide.

2009: Nestlé Waters strengthens its presence in two key emerging countries: in Brazil by acquiring Àguas de Santa Barbara in the São Paulo region; and in China by acquiring Dashan Drinks, the leading bottled water player in Yunnan Province

In 2009, a U.S. report entitled "Tour D'Horizon with Nestle: Forget the Global Financial Crisis, the World Is Running out of Fresh Water" involved the departments of agriculture, commerce, energy and environment science and technology as a result of Nestle executives from Switzerland advising of their research. One of the main aspects asserts that a high meat-based diet uses water inefficiently, particularly for an increasing global population. Livestock feed on crops that require high amounts of water such corn and soy. High demand for water overall has already created a drain on underground aquifers and other natural fresh water sources worldwide. Nestle estimates that: “There is not nearly enough fresh water available to provide this standard to a global population expected to exceed 9 billion by mid-century.” The report points out the need to attend to where water is being flowed and asks for greater efficiency in its global delivery.

Also in that same year of 2009, on April 23, during a Nestle Waters shareholders' meeting at the headquarters in Greenwich, Connecticut, a protest group arrived with the campaign of "Think Outside the Bottle" (from Corporate Accountability International, along with representatives from both Michigan Citizens for Water Conservation and Protecting Our Water and Wildlife Resources), claiming Nestle Waters, for the sake of increasing profits, overrode local rights to "community water resources" despite protective opposition. The campaign director Deborah Lapidus said, "These water grabs are having long-lasting impacts on ecosystems and water supplies long held in the public trust." she said. One of the specific cases the organization protested against was regarding when Nestle bypassed a 2006 Shapleigh, Maine ordinance that aimed to maintain local control over water resources by accessing the law through the state level. Nestle officials responded by giving a progress report on their intentions for transparency with labeling their water sources and locations.

2012: Nestlé Waters establish a distribution agreement with Ambev in Brasil

2013:  
- Official opening of the new factory in Buxton (United Kingdom)
- New factory in Pocheon Edong (South Korea) with Pulmuone Waters
- Acquisition of the Mineral water spring Vale do Sol in Brasil

2020: Nestlé Waters announced the planned sale of its Canadian water bottling division to Ice River Springs; the latter was expected to take over the Nestlé Pure Life brand and the ReadyRefresh delivery service. The deal required regulatory approval which was not achieved in a timely manner; consequently, Nestle cancelled the deal in early September.

2021: Nestlé announced on 16 February that it had agreed to sell its water brands to One Rock Capital Partners and Metropoulos & Co. The sale, expected to conclude in spring, would include the spring water and mountain brands in Canada and the US, the purified water brand and the delivery service. The plan did not include the Perrier, S.Pellegrino and Acqua Panna brands. In early April 2021, the sale was concluded, with its US operations now operating as BlueTriton Brands.

See also
 BlueTriton Brands
 Corporate Accountability International
 International Bottled Water Association
 List of Nestlé brands
 Nestlé Pure Life

References 

W
Bottled water brands
Food and drink companies established in 1992
French companies established in 1992
Drink companies of France
Hauts-de-Seine
Companies based in Île-de-France